Kulul is a former Costanoan settlement in Monterey County, California. Its precise location is unknown.

References

Former settlements in Monterey County, California
Former Native American populated places in California
Costanoan populated places